GBA-23 (Ghanche-II) is a constituency of Gilgit Baltistan Assembly which is currently represented by Abdul Hameed.

Members

Election results

2009
Mufti Muhammad Abdullah of Pakistan Muslim League (N) became member of assembly by getting 4,240 votes.

2015
Ghulam Hussain of PML-N won this seat again by getting 6,657 votes.

2020

Abdul Hameed an Independent candidate won this seat  by getting 3,657 votes.

References

Gilgit-Baltistan Legislative Assembly constituencies